The Whitianga Festival of Speed (Whitianga FOS) was a motorsport festival held in the seaside town of Whitianga on the Coromandel Peninsula in New Zealand in 2009 and 2010.  The festival hosted a multitude of events including the New Zealand Helicopter Championships, Offshore powerboat racing, Aerobatic Displays, Off-road Vehicle Demonstrations, Jet ski racing and bespoke events such as Rally Car Vs Helicopter racing. The event was free for spectators.

Events
The motorsport events held at the festival were:

Mass Aircraft Flyover
New Zealand Helicopter Championships
Warbird display
Hellicopters opening beer bottles
Hellicopters racing Rally Cars
Big Boat Race
Jet ski Racing
Yak Aircraft aerobatic display
Mustang Aircraft and Kittyhawk aerobatic display
ThunderCat vs Jet ski event
Offshore Power Boat vs Helicopter race
NZOPA Offshore Power Boat Race
Royal New Zealand Navy Patrol Vessel display
Parachuting swooping display
Go Kart race
Mini club skill driving event
Drift Car demonstration
Motorcycle stunt riding
V8 Supercar display
Jetsprint demonstration and race
Lawn mower racing
NZ off-road series race
Drag Race
Rolling Thunder Parade
Helicopter Display
Auto show

History
The inaugural Whitianga Festival of Speed was held over the weekend of 4–5 April 2009 as an additional event in the New Zealand Offshore Power Boat Series. It attracted an estimated 15,000–20,000 spectators.

The 2010 event was held on the weekend of 10–11 April and saw the crowd double to an estimated 40,000.

References

External links
 Whitianga Festival of Speed website

Motorsport in New Zealand
Thames-Coromandel District
Sport in Waikato